Shady Part of Me is puzzle-platform video game developed by Douze Dixièmes and published by Focus Home Interactive for Microsoft Windows, Nintendo Switch, PlayStation 4 and Xbox One. It was announced at The Game Awards 2020 and released on the same day.

Reception 
Shady Part of Me received "generally favorable" reviews according to review aggregator Metacritic.

References

External links 

2020 video games
Focus Entertainment games
Nintendo Switch games
Puzzle-platform games
PlayStation 4 games
Single-player video games
Video games developed in France
Video games featuring female protagonists
Windows games
Xbox One games